Wojciech Krauze  (born 7 July 1983) is a Polish professional footballer (striker) playing currently for Kmita Zabierzów.

External links
 

1983 births
Living people
Polish footballers
GKS Katowice players
Korinthos F.C. players
Place of birth missing (living people)
Association football forwards
Unia Tarnów players